Al Khor Island, also known as Jazirat bin Ghanim and Purple Island, is an island located in the municipality of Al Khor on the northeast coast of Qatar. It accommodates the only archaeological site in the country attributable to the second millennium BC. There are four main periods of occupation on the island, dating from as early as c. 2000 BC to as late as 1900 AD. The island is best known for being the site of operation of a Kassite-controlled purple dye industry in the second millennium BC.

Geography
Al Khor Island is located approximately 50 km north of the capital Doha. It is connected to land by a tapered dirt pathway which runs through a number of streams.

Spanning an area of 1.67 km², the island is found on the eastern side of a sheltered bay which is overlooked by the city of Al Khor. The width of the bay ranges from 2.2 to 6.5 km. It is linked to the open sea by a channel with a width of roughly 750 meters on its southern end. It is separated from the city of Al Khor by a distance of 420 meters of low water. Many mangroves (Avicennia marina) are found off its southeast and east coast. No potable water was detected on the island but known sources are nearby.

On the coast there are friable and level-surfaced beachrock formations, upon which various sea snail shells were discovered. While the relatively high outcroppings contain traces of man-made structures such as burial mounds, the vast majority of archaeological discoveries were made on the level areas surrounding these outcroppings.

Archaeology

Neolithic
Definitive occupation of the island during the Neolithic period is inconclusive. Several Neolithic campsites and Ubaid potsherds were discovered approximately 6 km east of the island. It has been suggested that the island was visited by these Neolithic inhabitants.

Early Dilmun period
Pottery originating from the Dilmun civilization suggests the island was linked with the Bahrain-based civilization from c. 2000 to 1750 BC. Ceramics dating to the early Dilmun period consist mainly of medium-sized jars and cooking pots. The settlements dating to the Dilmun period may have been established to expedite trade journeys between Bahrain to the closest significant settlement in the Persian Gulf, Tell Abraq. Another scenario entails that the encampments were created by visiting fishermen or pearl fishers from Dilmun. It has also been suggested that the presence of pottery is indicative of trade between the inhabitants of Al Khor Island and the Dilmun civilization, though this is considered unlikely due to the scarce population of Qatar during this period.

Kassite period
The Kassites operated a purple dye industry on the island from c. 1400 to 1100 BC. There were also trade relations between the inhabitants of Qatar and the Kassite. Among the findings were 3,000,000 crushed snail shells and Kassite potsherds. It has been asserted that the island is the site of the earliest known production of purple shellfish dye. The dye was obtained from the Murex snail and dubbed "Tyrian purple".

Sasanian period
Artifacts originating from the late Sasanian period, from c. 400 to 600 AD, were found here.

Late Islamic period
Al Khor Island was inhabited during the late Islamic period, from c. 1700 to 1900.

Discovery
The Mission Archéologique Français à Qatar, a French team led by Jacques Tixier, discovered the site in 1976.

Gallery

See also
 List of islands of Qatar

References 

Al Khor
Archaeological sites in Qatar
Islands of Qatar
Ubaid period